Paula L. Woods (born 1953 in Los Angeles) is an African-American crime novelist and literary critic. Her 1999 novel, Inner City Blues, won the Macavity Award for best first mystery, and was followed by other novels featuring its heroine, L.A. policewoman Charlotte Justice. She has also edited an anthology of African-American crime literature and co-edited (with Felix H. Liddell) three anthologies of African American literature illustrated with African American fine art.

Crime fiction novels
Inner City Blues (1999)
Stormy Weather (2001)
Dirty Laundry (2003)
Strange Bedfellows (2006)

Editor
Spooks, Spies and Private Eyes: Black Mystery, Crime and Suspense Fiction of the 20th Century (1995)
With Felix H. Liddell:
Merry Christmas, Baby: A Christmas and Kwanzaa Treasury (1996)
I Hear a Symphony: African Americans Celebrate Love (1994)
I, Too, Sing America: The African American Book of Days (1992)

References

External links
 Interviews and articles on author’s website

1953 births
Living people
20th-century American novelists
21st-century American novelists
African-American novelists
American crime writers
American mystery writers
American women novelists
Macavity Award winners
Writers from Los Angeles
Women mystery writers
20th-century American women writers
21st-century American women writers
20th-century African-American women
21st-century African-American women writers
21st-century African-American writers